Cris Campion (born 1 September 1966) is a French film and television actor, previously known as Thierry Campion.

Born in Versailles, Campion's first leading role came in Roman Polanski’s Pirates (1986). The next year, he was nominated for a César Award for Most Promising Actor for Field of Honor. In Charlemagne, le prince à cheval (1993), he played Pepin the Hunchback.

Campion married Anny Duperey in 1993, two years after she had left Bernard Giraudeau, but they separated after some ten years. Duperey has called Giraudeau “the man of my life” and Campion “the love of my life”.

Appearances
Le café (1985)
Pirates (1986), as Jean-Baptiste, called Frog
Field of Honor (1987), as Pierre Naboulet
Un sketch (1987)
Beyond Therapy (1987), as Andrew
The Ray Bradbury Theater (1988), as  Terwilliger
Le Client (short film, 1988), as Eric
Chillers (Day of Reckoning) (1990), as Jean Arnaud
Fortune Express (1991), as Pascal Perkiss
The Adventures of Young Indiana Jones (1992), as Lieutenant Gaston
Sup de fric (Christian Gion, 1992), as Victor Dargelas
Ma sœur, mon amour (1992), as Gaetan
Le voyage d'Eva (1992), as Laurent
Charlemagne, le prince à cheval (television, 1993), as Pepin the Hunchback
Fortitude (television, 1994), as Pierrot
Taxandria (1995), dubbing
Navarro (television series, 1995 season), as Antoine
La Femme de la forêt (1996), as Bertrand
Exit Wounds (1997), as Cyril
Le Bahut (television series, 1998 season), as Jérôme
Une famille formidable (2000), as Vincent
Marie Fransson (2001), as Atlas
Méditerranée (2001, television), as Marco
Gaetan et Rachel en toute innocence  (2002)
Leave Your Hands on My Hips (2003), as Musician
Julie Lescaut (television series, 2003 episode “Hors la loi”), as Berteau
Frank Riva (television series, 2004) as Stan
The Waves (2005)
Standing Tall (2005, TV)
Les Hauts plateaux (stage play)
PJ (television series, 2006 season), as Jean-Marie
Greco (television, 2007), as Joseph
Section de recherches (2007), as Alain
Plus belle la vie (television soap, 2008 season), as Cédric

Notes

External links

Cris Campion at bfi.org.uk

1966 births
French actors
French directors
Living people
People from Versailles